Chasing Summer is the third studio album by American  R&B artist  SiR. It was released on August 30, 2019 by Top Dawg Entertainment and RCA Records. The album includes guest features from Kendrick Lamar, Lil Wayne, Jill Scott, Smino, Kadhja Bonet, Sabrina Claudio, and Zacari.

Singles and promotion
On August 8, 2019, SiR released the leading single of the album "Hair Down" featuring Kendrick Lamar. The music video was also released on the same day directed by Psycho Films' Jack Begert.

In April 2020, the single for "John Redcorn" was released with a music video inspired by King of the Hill.

Critical reception

Reviewing the album for Pitchfork, Dani Blum said SiR took a darker approach with this album claiming it is a "sad and gauzy R&B collection", saying "at 14 songs, the album feels bloated. Its swirl of features are hit or miss. Smino and Kendrick Lamar inject life into the spaces SiR hollows out." The writer continued to say "The effect is an album that bristles with paranoia. SiR creates conditions in which actual relationships are impossible: He's always in the wrong place at the wrong time; he replays conversations that never happened; he waits for calls he won’t take."

Track listing

Charts

References

2019 albums
Sir (singer) albums
Top Dawg Entertainment albums
Albums produced by Boi-1da
Albums produced by Sounwave
Albums produced by Tae Beast
Albums produced by Michael Uzowuru